Dujail District (formerly, Al-Faris) is a district in the southern part of Saladin Governorate, Iraq. Its main settlement is the small town of Dujail. 

The district's population of 91,170 people is nearly entirely Shia (except for a few villages on the banks of the Tigris) on the east. 

The town of Dujail was subject to a massacre by Saddam Hussein's agents, when an assassination was attempted on him while visiting. Ultimately, Saddam was tried, convicted and hanged for the said massacre at Dujail since none other charges needed to be proved for his conviction.

See also
 Dujail Massacre

Districts of Saladin Governorate